The Plainfield Crescent Cities were a minor league baseball team based in Plainfield, New Jersey. In 1891 and 1892, the Crescent Cities teams played exclusively as members of the Central New Jersey League, reportedly winning championships in both Seasons. Plainfield hosted home minor league games at the Crescent League Base Ball Grounds.

Baseball Hall of Fame member Willie Keeler played for the Plainfield Crescent Cities in 1891 and 1892, leading the league in hitting in 1891.

History
Minor league baseball play began in Plainfield, New Jersey in 1891. The Plainfield Crescent Cities began play when the Central New Jersey League was formed for the 1891 season as an Independent level minor league. The Westfield and Somerville teams were also among the teams in the league, with statistics of the 1891 season unknown. It was reported that Plainfield  won the championship. Baseball Hall of Fame member Willie Keeler played as a member of the 1891 Plainfield team and reportedly helped lead the Crescent Cities to the championship. Keeler hit .376 to lead the league while making $60.00 per month.

The Plainfield Crescent Cities continued play in the four–team 1892 Central New Jersey League. Plainfield began play in the Independent level league on May 26, 1892. The Plainfield Crescent Cities joined the Elizabeth team from Elizabeth, New Jersey, the Somerville West Ends from Somerville, New Jersey and Westfield Athletics from Westfield, New Jersey in league play.

The season concluded on September 24, 1892, with Plainfield tied for 1st place, playing under managers Charles Reed and Tom Keller. The Elizabeth and Westfield franchises both disbanded on September 3, 1892 with 5–11 records. The Plainfield Crescent Cities and Somerville West Ends were in a tie for 1st place with 12–6 records. However, Plainfield disbanded before a playoff with Somerville could be played.

Willie Keeler continued play as a member of the 1892 Plainfield Crescent Cities, at age 20. Keeler left the Plainfield team in June to join Birmingham of the Eastern League before making his major league debut later in the 1892 season. Keeler debuted with the New York Giants on September 30, 1892 at the Polo Grounds.

Before his release from the team in August, 1892, Crescent Cities player Willie Murphy started and operated a shooting gallery in Plainfield.

The Central New Jersey League permanently folded following the 1892 season. Plainfield has not hosted another minor league team.

On February 21, 1910, Plainfield fans held a banquet and reception for Willie Keeler at the Hotel Iroquis in Plainfield, presenting him with a silver cup. In a speech, Keeler expressed he was thankful for the support of the Plainfield fans and the franchise for being supportive and offering assistance in his career advancement.

The ballpark
The Plainfield Crescent Cities teams were noted to have played minor league home games at the Crescent League Base Ball Grounds. At the time, the ballpark was located at Somerset Street & Grandview Avenue, Plainfield, New Jersey.

Timeline

Year–by–year records

Notable alumni

Baseball Hall of Fame alumni
Willie Keeler (1891–1892) Inducted, 1939

Notable alumni
Tuck Turner (1892)
Bob Murphy (1892)
Willie Murphy (1892)

See also
Plainfield Crescent Cities players

References

External links
 Baseball Reference

Defunct minor league baseball teams
Defunct baseball teams in New Jersey
Baseball teams established in 1891
Baseball teams disestablished in 1892
Plainfield, New Jersey
Central New Jersey League teams
Union County, New Jersey